Shanmugasundaram was an Indian actor who has appeared in Tamil films. He began his career as an actor by starring in Ratha Thilagam (1963) and Karnan (1964), and continued his career for seven decades. He is also a dubbing artist. He has acted in over 500 Films in Tamil cinema industry. He died on 15 August 2017.

Career
Shanmugasundaram was born in Chennai to a family of businesspeople. When he was studying in college, he had accompanied one of his actor friends to a drama performance, and as one of the junior artists did not perform well, he was brought in spontaneously. To the surprise of many, he had done that role with efficiency, which earned him appreciation spontaneously. He then moved on to work in Tamil theatre, notably appearing as Adolf Hitler in a play also featuring Kannadasan. Sivaji Ganesan was impressed by his performances and recruited him to make film acting debut with Ratha Thilagam (1963), where he portrayed a Chinese army major. He next went on to play the mythological character of Salliya Chakravarthy in B. R. Panthulu's critically acclaimed Karnan (1964), a disabled man in K. S. Gopalakrishnan's Vazhaiyadi Vazhai and a prince in Dasavatharam (1976).

Shanmugasundaram's role in the 1989 Tamil film, Karagattakaran directed by Gangai Amaran, won him critical acclaim and prompted several film makers to offer him roles as a village chieftain and the scene where he pleads innocence to his sister (Gandhimathi) made him popular among mimicry artists. In the late 1990s and early 2000s, he moved on to feature in television serials, and collaborated with Raadhika in series such as Annamalai, Selvi and its sequel, Arasi. In the 2010s, he has regularly featured in films directed by Gangai Amaran's son, Venkat Prabhu.

Death
Shanmugasundaram died on August 15, 2017, due to age related ailments. on his age at 78.

Filmography 
This is a partial filmography. You can expand it.

1960s

1970s

1980s

1990s

2000s

2010s

As dubbing artist

Television 

Annamalai
Selvi
Raja Rajeshwari
Arasi
Sorgam
My dear bootham
Ketti Melam
Megala
Vasantham
Vamsam

References

External links

1940s births
2017 deaths
Tamil comedians
Tamil male actors
Male actors in Tamil cinema
Indian male film actors
Tamil male television actors
20th-century Indian male actors
21st-century Indian male actors
Indian male comedians
People from Mayiladuthurai district